Settimo Vittone is a comune (municipality) in the Metropolitan City of Turin, Piedmont, northern Italy.

Main sights

The main sights are the castle, pieve (pleban church), and the baptistery of St. Lawrence (the bishop of Autun, dear to the Frank people),  dating to the late 9th century. It is one of the main examples of pre-Romanesque architecture in Piedmont, often featuring a bell tower and a rectangular apse. It is home to numerous frescoes, dating from the mid-11th to the late 15th centuries.
Settimo has a derivation from septimum lapidem from the city of Ivrea on the Consular Roman road of the Gauls. Here are found the ruins of the ancient fortress, which legend says was built by Attone Anscario, Ansgarda's brother, queen of Franks and here buried. In the 14th century Savoy took control of all the area and incorporated it to their Duchy; the ancient Lords of the place (the Enrico) were nominated Counts. In the 16th century the Castle-Fortress was destroyed and replaced by a new Villa-palace called "New Castle". The Colma di Mombarone mountain is located nearby.

References

 

Cities and towns in Piedmont